Renaldo Kalari (born 25 June 1984) is an Albanian retired football player.

Club career
Kalari is a product of the KF Tirana academy and joined the senior team in 2004 but found it very difficult to break through into the squad, this subsequently lead to Kalari being loan out to Shkumbini Peqin for the 2005–06 campaign. His return to Tirana did not last as he signed for Kastrioti Krujë in 2006, where he would stay for the next two seasons until the club was relegated to the Albanian First Division.

He returned to the capital in the summer of 2008 with Partizani Tirana but only played for the first half of the 2008–09 season, as the club was in turmoil. He left Partizani joined Kastrioti once again in January 2009, helping the club win promotion to the Albanian Superliga. He became one of the club's main players in the next few season, which was noted by the player's former club KF Tirana, who gave him the chance to return once again to his hometown. In February 2013, he was sent on loan to Kastrioti Krujë until the end of 2012–13 season.

During the summer transfer window 2015, Kalari left Tirana and signed with their cross-town rivals Partizani Tirana, taking the vacant squad number 99 for the upcoming 2015–16 season. On 30 September 2016, during the league match against the rivals Skënderbeu Korçë, which finished in a goalless draw, Kalari received a controversial 61st minute red card after a tackle on Liridon Latifi. Later on 27 May, he scored his first Partizani goal in the final matchday of 2016–17 season against the same opponent, netting a free-kick in an eventual 2–2 draw, which was enough for the team to clinch the second position.

On 18 June 2017, Kalari agreed a contract extension, signing until June 2018.

International career
Kalari made his first and only appearance for Albania U16 on 8 October 2000 in the match against Georgia which finished in a 1–0 away defeat.

Career statistics

Honours
Tirana
Albanian Cup: 2011–12
Albanian Supercup: 2011, 2012

References

External links

1984 births
Living people
Footballers from Tirana
Albanian footballers
Association football defenders
Albania youth international footballers
KF Tirana players
KS Kastrioti players
KS Shkumbini Peqin players
FK Partizani Tirana players
Kategoria Superiore players
Albanian football managers
FK Partizani Tirana managers
Kategoria Superiore managers